Serra Cavallera is a mountain range within Girona near Pardines and Ribes de Freser. It lies west of the :ca:Serra de Montgrony.

References

Mountain ranges of Catalonia
Ripollès